Alloise, stage name of Alla Jevhenivna Moskovka (Ukrainian: Алла Євгенівна Московка; born 19 October 1984) is a Ukrainian singer.

Life and career 
Born in Poltava, Alloise started her career as a member of the musical groups Tomato Jaws and Gorchitza, before launching her solo career in 2012, winning the same year the MTV Europe Music Award for Best Ukrainian Act.

In 2016 she took took part in Vidbir, reaching the semi-finals with the song "Crown". Episodes, the singer's second LP, was released a few weeks later.

About four years later, she returned to the music scene with the release of the EP Bare Nerve, which was nominated at YUNA in the "Best Release in Other Formats" category. The same year she launched the side project VCHASNO, a musical collaboration with Portuguese poet Mogni Rarchi.

Discography
 with Gorchitza 
   Highlights (2008) 
     It's You (2011) 
 
 Solo
 
 Bygone (2013)
 Episodes (2016)
 Bare Nerve (EP, 2020)

References

External links
  
  
 

1984 births
Living people 
Ukrainian women singers
Ukrainian pop singers
People from Poltava
MTV Europe Music Award winners